Gymnoscelis olsoufieffae is a moth in the family Geometridae. It was described by Louis Beethoven Prout in 1937. It is endemic to South Africa.

References

Moths described in 1937
olsoufieffae
Endemic moths of South Africa